The Colony of New Zealand was a colony of the United Kingdom of Great Britain and Ireland that encompassed the islands of New Zealand from 1841 to 1907. The power of the British Government was vested in the governor of New Zealand. The colony had three capitals: Okiato (or Old Russell) in 1841; Auckland from 1841 to 1865; and Wellington, which was the capital until the colony's reorganisation into a Dominion, and continues to be the capital of New Zealand to the present day.

Created as a Crown Colony, during the early years of settlement the governor had wide-ranging powers. In 1852, the colony was granted self-government with the passage of the New Zealand Constitution Act 1852. Subsequently, the first parliament was elected in 1853, and responsible government was established in 1856. The governor was required to act on the advice of his ministers, who were responsible to the parliament. In 1907, the colony became the Dominion of New Zealand, which heralded a more explicit recognition of self-government within the British Empire.

History

Establishment 

Following a proclamation of sovereignty over New Zealand from Sydney in January 1840, Captain William Hobson came to New Zealand and issued the same (tentative) proclamation on 1 February 1840.

The Treaty of Waitangi—between Māori chiefs and British representatives of Queen Victoria—was subsequently signed on 6 February 1840, with Hobson again declaring British sovereignty over the islands of New Zealand on 21 May 1840 in two separate formal declarations. In the first declaration, Hobson declared British sovereignty over the North Island. The basis for the claim over the North Island was the Treaty of Waitangi. In the English version of the treaty, Māori ceded sovereignty in return for the rights, privileges and protections of being a British subject. In the second declaration, Hobson declared British sovereignty over the South Island and Stewart Island on the basis of "first discovery" by Captain James Cook in 1769. Queen Victoria became the sovereign over all New Zealand.

Initially, New Zealand was part of the Colony of New South Wales, and Lieutenant-Governor Hobson was answerable to his superior, the governor of New South Wales. By letters patent, the British (Imperial) Government issued the Charter for Erecting the Colony of New Zealand on 16 November 1840. The Charter stated that the Colony of New Zealand would be established as a Crown colony separate from New South Wales on 3 May 1841.

Crown colony 
With the establishment of the Crown colony, Hobson became governor of New Zealand. The first organs of the New Zealand Government were also established to assist the governor: an Executive Council and a (General) Legislative Council.

The Executive Council consisted of the attorney-general, colonial secretary, and colonial treasurer. The Legislative Council consisted of the governor, Executive Council, and three justices of the peace appointed by the governor. The Legislative Council had the power to issue laws called Ordinances.

The colony was initially divided into three provinces: New Ulster Province (the North Island), New Munster Province (the South Island), and New Leinster Province (Stewart Island).

Self-governance 

As new European settlements were founded in the colony, demands for self-government became louder. The New Zealand Company settlement of Port Nicholson (Wellington) had its own elected council, which was forcibly dissolved by Lieutenant-Governor William Hobson in 1840. Later, Wellington became the centre of agitation by settlers for a representative government led by Samuel Revans, who founded the Wellington Settlers' Constitutional Association in 1848.

The first New Zealand Constitution Act was passed in 1846, though Governor George Grey was opposed to provisions that would divide the country into European and Māori districts. As a result, almost all of the Act was suspended for six years pending a new Act of 1852, with the only operative part of the 1846 Act being the creation of New Zealand's first provinces. In the meantime, Grey drafted his own Act which established both provincial and central representative assemblies, and allowed for Māori districts and an elected governor. The latter proposal was rejected by the Parliament of the United Kingdom when it adopted Grey's constitution.

The second New Zealand Constitution Act was passed in 1852 and became the central constitutional document of the colony. It created the General Assembly, which consisted of the Legislative Council and an elected House of Representatives. The first general election for the House of Representatives was held from 14 July 1853 until early October.

The 1st New Zealand Parliament was opened on 24 May 1854. The Administrator of Government, Robert Wynyard, was quickly confronted by the demands of the new parliament that responsible government be granted to the colony immediately; on 2 June the House of Representatives passed a resolution, sponsored by Edward Gibbon Wakefield, to that effect. Wynyard refused, stating that the Colonial Office made no mention of responsible government in its dispatches. The Executive Council advised Wynyard against implementing responsible government, and in the meantime, he sent a dispatch to London requesting clarification. Wynyard then offered to add some elected members of parliament to the Executive Council, and appointed James FitzGerald, Henry Sewell and Frederick Weld to the council. The compromise worked for a few weeks but on 1 August parliament demanded complete power to appoint ministers. Wynyard refused, and all three MPs resigned from the council. In response, Wynyard prorogued parliament for two weeks. On 31 August, he appointed Thomas Forsaith, Jerningham Wakefield and James Macandrew to the Executive Council, but when parliament met again, it moved a motion of no confidence in the members.

Parliament met on 8 August 1855, by which time Wynyard had received instructions from the Colonial Office to introduce responsible government. The new governor, Sir Thomas Gore Browne, arrived on 6 September 1855 and relieved Wynyard of his duties. On 28 January 1858, Wynyard was appointed to the Legislative Council.

Governor Thomas Gore Browne subsequently announced that self-government would begin with the 2nd New Zealand Parliament, elected in 1855. Henry Sewell was asked by the governor to form a government, now known as the Sewell Ministry. He became colonial secretary—effectively the first Premier of New Zealand—on 7 May. Sewell's government was short-lived, however. The leader of the provincialist (pro-provinces) faction, William Fox, defeated Sewell's government on 20 May 1856. Fox himself, however, did not retain office for long, being defeated by Edward Stafford, a moderate.

Elevation to Dominion 

The Colony of New Zealand continued until 26 September 1907, when, as a result of a decision by the 1907 Imperial Conference and by request of the New Zealand Government, King Edward VII declared New Zealand to be a Dominion. On the same day, the King issued another Royal Proclamation granting the Colony of Newfoundland the status of Dominion of Newfoundland. The 1907 change from Colony to Dominion was largely symbolic, and New Zealand did not become independent until the General Assembly of New Zealand enacted the Statute of Westminster Adoption Act 1947, which applied the Statute of Westminster 1931 to the Dominion of New Zealand (although the United Kingdom retained the right to legislate for New Zealand at its request); certain colonial enactments survived for sometime after—the New Zealand Constitution Act 1852 was finally replaced by the Constitution Act 1986.

A Royal Proclamation granting New Zealand Dominion status was issued on 26 September 1907. 
It read – ". Whereas We have on the Petition of the Members of the Legislative Council and House of Representatives of Our Colony of New Zealand determined that the title of Dominion of New Zealand shall be substituted for that of the Colony of New Zealand as the designation of the said Colony, We have therefore by and with the advice of Our Privy Council thought fit to issue this Our Royal Proclamation and We do ordain, declare and command that on and after the twenty-sixth day of September, one thousand nine hundred and seven, the said Colony of New Zealand and the territory belonging thereto shall be called and known by the title of the Dominion of New Zealand. And We hereby give Our Commands to all Public Departments accordingly.

Demography

1851 population estimates

Flags

The first flag used by the Colony of New Zealand was the British Union Flag. This began to change with the Colonial Naval Defence Act 1865, which required all ships owned by colonial governments to fly the defaced Royal Navy blue ensign with a colonial badge. New Zealand did not have a colonial badge, or indeed a coat of arms of its own at this stage, and so the letters "NZ" were added to the blue ensign. The Colony New Zealand used the same royal coat of arms as the United Kingdom.

In 1869, Albert Hastings Markham, a first lieutenant on the Royal Navy vessel HMS Blanche, submitted a national ensign design to Sir George Bowen, the Governor of New Zealand. It was initially used only on government ships, but was adopted as the de facto national flag in a surge of patriotism arising from the Second Boer War in 1902. To end confusion between the various designs of the flag, the Liberal Government passed the Ensign and Code Signals Bill, which was approved by King Edward VII on 24 March 1902, declaring the flag as New Zealand's national flag.

See also

History of New Zealand
List of governors of New Zealand

References

Citations

Bibliography 

 
 
 Peter Spiller et al. (2001, 2nd ed.) A New Zealand Legal History (Brookers: Wellington).

 
Colony
Former British colonies and protectorates in Oceania
1841 establishments in New Zealand
1907 disestablishments in Oceania